Dr. Gwendolyn D. Pough (1970s) is an American academic and scholar in rhetoric and composition studies. She is a post-Civil Rights African-American academic who developed as a writer during the rise of hip-hop culture.

Education 

Pough received her B.A. in English with a minor in African, African-American, and Caribbean Studies from the William Paterson College in 1992 where she graduated Cum Laude. For her Masters of Art, she graduated with honors in English with a concentration in Creative Writing and Composition Studies from Northeastern University in 1994. She received her Ph.D. in English from Miami University in 2000.

Career 

Pough is the department chair of Women's and Gender Studies at Syracuse University. She also served as the director of Graduate Studies for 5 years.

Her current research and teaching interests are feminist theory, African-American rhetoric, women's studies, and hip-hop culture.

In her 2015 book Check it While I Wreck It: Black Womanhood, Hip Hop Culture, and the Public Sphere, Pough compares Queen Latifah's song "U.N.I.T.Y." to Sojourner Truth's 1851 "Ain't I a Woman?" speech. Both have the similar theme of expecting women to be heard and respected. Additionally, Pough emphasizes the importance of "U.N.I.T.Y." by stating how the song discusses issues on Queen Latifah's own terms and igniting a conversation.

She has also been critical of what she regards as racist division in the women's rights movement, stating that black women were ignored during the women's suffrage movement and that this trend is still current. Pough shared her concerns about the 2017 Women's March on Washington, an event planned to protest Donald Trump. She said that some of these same women attending the protest had also voted for him, and said that 94% of black women voted for Hillary Clinton and 53% of white women had voted for Donald Trump.

In addition to her scholarly work, Pough is a romance author under the pseudonym of Gwyneth Bolton. She is a ten-time winner of the Romance Slam Jam Emma Award; she also won the Romance in Color Reviewer's Choice Award for "Favorite New Author" in 2006.

She co-edited Home Girls Make Some Noise: Hip-Hop Feminism Anthology. She was guest editor for three special anonymous peer reviewed journals: Peitho: Journal of the Coalition of Feminist Scholars in the History of Rhetoric & Composition, Social Identities, Journal for the Study of Race, Nation and Culture, and FEMSPEC.

Selected works

Books 

 Check it While I Wreck It: Black Womanhood, Hip Hop Culture, and the Public Sphere (2015)
 Home Girls Make Some Noise: Hip-Hop Feminism Anthology (2007).

Articles 

 "Empowering Rhetoric: Black Students Writing Black Panthers" (2002)
 Love Feminism, but Where's my Hip-Hop? Shaping a Black Feminist Identity (2002)
 "Love Feminism, but where's my Hip-Hop? Shaping a Black Feminist Identity" (2002)
 "Do Ladies Run This . . . ? Some Thoughts on Hip-Hop Feminism" (2003)
 "Seeds and Legacies: Tapping the potential hip-hop" (2004)
 "Rhetoric that Should have Moved the People: Rethinking the Black Panther Party" (2004)
 "Speculative Black Women: Magic, Fantasy, and the Supernatural" (2005)
 "Women, Rap, Wreck" (2006)
 "Hip-Hop Soul Divas and Rap Music: Critiquing the Love that Hate Produced" (2007)
 "What It Do, Shorty?: Women, hip-hop, and a feminist agenda" (2007)
"An Introduction of Sorts for Hip-Hop Feminism" (2007)
"The Remix: Revisit, Rethink, Revise, Renew" (2010)

References

Living people
American rhetoricians
Women's studies academics
Syracuse University faculty
William Paterson University alumni
Northeastern University alumni
Miami University alumni
Year of birth missing (living people)